Angélica is a Mexican telenovela produced by Ernesto Alonso for Televisa in 1985. It is an original story by Marissa Garrido and directed by Sergio Jiménez.

Erika Buenfil and Sergio Goyri starred as protagonists, while Alejandro Camacho and Rebecca Jones starred as main antagonists.

Cast 

Erika Buenfil as Angélica Estrada
Sergio Goyri as Humberto Corona
Alejandro Camacho as Guillermo Corona
Emilia Carranza as Rosaura Monterde
Chela Castro as Eloísa
Eduardo Liñán as Alfonso
Gloria Mayo as Carmen
Rebecca Jones as Silvia
Amparo Arozamena as Aunt Chabela
Olivia Collins as Leticia
Rafael Amador as Manuel
Juan Diego Fernández as Juan
Lucianne Silva as Mónica
Marco Muñoz as Rafael
Selene Higareda as Mayra
Myrrah Saavedra as Teresa
Carmen Cortés as Nana
Jorge Victoria as Fernando
César Adrián Sánchez as Toño
Arturo Angler as Bernabé
Héctor Madrigal as Federico
Edgardo Gazcón as Carlos
Francisco Avendaño as Mario
Macario Álvarez as Lic. Olmos
Toño Infante as Capitán Trejo
Luis Xavier as José Luis
Maristel Molina as Srta. López
Ricardo González as Javier
Fernando Moncada as El Grande
José Pereira as Raúl
José Luis Llamas as Doctor
José Carlos Teruel as Roby
Norma Iturbe as Secretary
Ricardo Salas as Javier
Diego Schoening

Awards

References

External links

Mexican telenovelas
1985 telenovelas
1985 Mexican television series debuts
1985 Mexican television series endings
Spanish-language telenovelas
Television shows set in Mexico City
Televisa telenovelas